Gigartinaceae is a red algae family in the order Gigartinales.

Genera
Genera in the family Gigartinaceae include:

Chondracanthus Kützing, 1843
Chondrus Stackhouse, 1797
Gigartina Stackhouse, 1809
Iridaea Bory de Saint-Vincent, 1826
Mazzaella G. De Toni, 1936
Ostiophyllum Kraft, 2003
Psilophycus W.A.Nelson, Leister & Hommersand, 2011
Rhodoglossum J.Agardh, 1876
Sarcothalia Kützing, 1849

References

 
Red algae families
Taxa named by Friedrich Traugott Kützing